Crauford Kent (12 October 1881 – 14 May 1953) was an English character actor based in the United States. He has also been credited as Craufurd Kent and Crawford Kent.

Biography 

Kent was born on 12 October 1881 in London. A stage actor in England, Kent first came to the United States as a first-class passenger on the S/S Teutonic, docking at the Port of New York late in July 1910; for some time afterwards, he acted both in Great Britain and the United States. Between 1915 and 1952, Kent appeared in 208 American films, although frequently without screen credit, including Silas Marner, Seven Keys to Baldpate, The Ace of Scotland Yard, The Menace, The Wolf of Wall Street, Little Miss Marker, The Picture of Dorian Gray, The Dolly Sisters, and Pat and Mike.

Death 
Kent died in Hollywood, California of a heart attack at age 72. His grave is located at Pierce Brothers Valhalla Memorial Park.

Selected filmography 

The Deep Purple (1915) – Harry Leland
Greater Love Hath No Man (1915) – Harold
Simon, the Jester (1915) – Dale Kingsley
The Pretenders (1915) – Dick Mason – a Young Clubman
Nedra (1915) – Henry Veath
Sorrows of Happiness (1916) – David Garrick
Her Bleeding Heart (1916) – Allen Craven
Dollars and Sense (1916) – Arthur Crewe
Love's Toll (1916) – Allen Crauben
The Evil Thereof (1916) – The Barber
 The Heart of the Hills (1916) – McInnes
Broadway Jones (1917) – Robert Wallace
Double Crossed (1917) – Frederick Stratton
The Antics of Ann (1917) – Gordon Trent
Thaïs (1917) – Lollius
 The Woman Beneath (1917)
The Song of Songs (1918) – Dick Laird
The Knife (1918) – Billy Meredith
The Trap (1918) – Stuart Kendall
The Ordeal of Rosetta (1918) – Aubrey Hapgood
The Danger Mark (1918) – Jack Dysart
The Inn of the Blue Moon (1918) – Charlton Sloane
Kildare of Storm (1918) – Dr. Jacques Benoix
The Better Half (1918) – Hendrick Thurston
 Thou Shalt Not (1919) – The Minister
Good Gracious, Annabelle (1919) – George Wimbledon
Come Out of the Kitchen (1919) – Randolf Weeks
The Splendid Romance (1919) – Minor Role
The Career of Katherine Bush (1919) – Lord Gerald Strobridge
 Other Men's Shoes (1920) – Stephen Browning
 Youthful Folly (1920) – David Montgomery
Sinners (1920) – Dr. Simpson
Dollars and the Woman (1920) – Arthur Carewe
The Love Flower (1920) – Mrs. Bevan's Visitor
Clothes (1920) – Richard Burbank
The Plaything of Broadway (1921) – Dr. Jennings
Jane Eyre (1921) – St. John Rivers
 Shadows of the Sea (1922) – Andrews
Other Women's Clothes (1922) – Rupert Lewis
The Hidden Woman (1922) – Bart Andrews
 Silas Marner (1922) – Silas Marner
Shirley of the Circus (1922) – James Blackthorne
The Abysmal Brute (1923) – Deane Warner
The Self-Made Wife (1923) – Tim Godwin
 Mothers-in-Law (1923) – Alden Van Buren
The Eagle's Feather (1923) – Count De Longe
Daddies (1923) – William Rivers
Lilies of the Field (1924) – Walter Harker
Flowing Gold (1924) – Henry Nelson
The Guilty One (1924) – Seaton Davies
Lovers' Lane (1924) – Herbert Woodbridge
 Virtue's Revolt (1924) – Bertram Winthrope
The Painted Flapper (1924) – Egbert Von Alyn
 Turned Up (1924) – Paul Gilmore
Easy Money (1925) – Lewis
Man and Maid (1925) – Colonel George Harcourt
 The Pride of the Force (1925) – Charley Weldon
The Midshipman (1925) – Basil Courtney
Seven Keys to Baldpate (1925) – Bentley
The Outsider (1926) – Dr. Ladd
Fifth Avenue (1926) – Allan Trainor
 Pirates of the Sky (1926) – Bruce Mitchell
Out of the Storm (1926) – Defense Attorney
Morganson's Finish (1926) – G.T. Williams
The Winning Wallop (1926) – Lawrence Duncan
 College Days (1926) – Kent
That Model from Paris (1926) – Henry Marsh
See You in Jail (1927) – Roger Morrisey
Mother (1927) – Ellis
The Missing Link (1927) – Lord Melville Dryden
Rose of the Bowery (1927)
His Dog (1927) – Mr. Gault
Little Mickey Grogan (1927) – Mr. Cabel
Wallflowers (1928) – Maulsby
Queen of the Chorus (1928) – Spencer Steele
The Olympic Hero (1928) – Man-About-Town
 Into No Man's Land (1928) – Th Duke
The Foreign Legion (1928) – Capt. Arnaud
 Out with the Tide (1928) – Ralph Kennedy
 Manhattan Knights (1928) – Henry Ryder
 Bitter Sweets (1928) – Paul Gebhardt
Show Folks (1928) – McNary – Vaudeville Producer
Blindfold (1928) – Ackroyd
Man, Woman and Wife (1929) – Wade / Ward Rogers
The Wolf of Wall Street (1929) – Jessup
The Charlatan (1929) – District Attorney Frank Deering
Cherchez la Femme (1929)
Come Across (1929) – George Harcourt
The Ace of Scotland Yard (1929, a lost Universal serial) – Inspector Angus Blake
Seven Keys to Baldpate (1929) – Hal Bentley
In the Next Room (1930) – The Lover (Prologue)
Girl of the Port (1930) – Englishman (uncredited)
The Second Floor Mystery (1930) – Capt. Fraser-Freer
Ladies Love Brutes (1930) – Committeeman (uncredited)
Sweethearts and Wives (1930) – Sir John Deptford
The Unholy Three (1930) – Defense Attorney
Three Faces East (1930) – General Hewlett
The Devil to Pay! (1930) – Arthur
Body and Soul (1931) – Major Burke
Women Men Marry (1931) – John Graham
Transatlantic (1931) – 1st Officer (uncredited)
Grief Street (1931) – Alvin Merle
Morals for Women (1931) – Mr. Marston
Delicious (1931) – Ship's Officer (uncredited)
 Stung (1931) – Reporter
Sally of the Subway (1932) – Moffitt
The Menace (1932) – Sam Lewis
Murder at Dawn (1932) – Arnstein
Sinister Hands (1932) – Judge David McLeod
Western Limited (1932) – James
The Purchase Price (1932) – A.C. Peters – the Banker (uncredited)
The Thirteenth Guest (1932) – Dr. Sherwood
The Fighting Gentleman (1932) – Claude Morgan
Payment Deferred (1932) – Broker (uncredited)
File 113 (1933) – Ottoman
Humanity (1933)
Sailor Be Good (1933)
The Eagle and the Hawk (1933) – General (uncredited)
Her Resale Value (1933)
Only Yesterday (1933) – Graves, Party Guest (uncredited)
The Invisible Man (1933) – Doctor (uncredited)
The House of Rothschild (1934) – Stock Trader #5
The Lost Jungle (1934, Serial) – Prof. Livingston – Explorer [Chs. 2-3]
Little Miss Marker (1934) – Doctor (uncredited)
Down to Their Last Yacht (1934) – Saxophone Player (uncredited)
Crimson Romance (1934) – English Officer
Lady by Choice (1934) – Brooke (uncredited)
We Live Again (1934) – Schonbock
Evelyn Prentice (1934) – Party Guest (uncredited)
The Man Who Reclaimed His Head (1934) – A Dignitary (uncredited)
Vanessa: Her Love Story (1935) – Timothy
Naughty Marietta (1935) – Minor Role (uncredited)
Born to Gamble (1935) – Town and Country Club Member (uncredited)
I Found Stella Parish (1935) – Lord Chamberlain (uncredited)
Mutiny on the Bounty (1935) – Lt. Edwards
Magnificent Obsession (1935) – Dr. Thomas (uncredited)
The Walking Dead (1936) – British Radio Announcer (uncredited)
Hitch Hike to Heaven (1936) – Edgar
O'Malley of the Mounted (1936) – Inspector McGregor
The Unguarded Hour (1936) – Inspector Thorpe (uncredited)
The White Angel (1936) – Orderly in Raglan's Office (uncredited)
It Couldn't Have Happened – But It Did (1936) – Bob Bennett
Down the Stretch (1936) – Sir Oliver Martin
The Luckiest Girl in the World (1936) – Judge
Daniel Boone (1936) – Attorney General
The Charge of the Light Brigade (1936) – Capt. Brown (uncredited)
Rich Relations (1937) – Mr. Colby
Navy Spy (1937) – Capt. Leeds
The Soldier and the Lady (1937) – Grand Duke's Aide (uncredited)
Parnell (1937) – Speaker of House (uncredited)
Topper (1937) – Board Member (uncredited)
The Toast of New York (1937) – Member of the Board of Directors (uncredited)
Souls at Sea (1937) – Navy Clerk (uncredited)
The Buccaneer (1938) – Victory Ball Guest (uncredited)
Love, Honor and Behave (1938) – Tennis Announcer
The Adventures of Robin Hood (1938) – Sir Norbett (uncredited)
Blond Cheat (1938) – Police Inspector Jones (uncredited)
Letter of Introduction (1938) – Mr. Sinclair (uncredited)
Service de Luxe (1938) – Mr. Devereaux
A Christmas Carol (1938) – Scrooge's Tall Business Associate (uncredited)
I Was a Convict (1939) – Dr. Garson
The Story of Alexander Graham Bell (1939) – General (uncredited)
Pride of the Blue Grass (1939) – Chief Steward (uncredited)
Rulers of the Sea (1939) – Member of Naval Company (uncredited)
Rovin' Tumbleweeds (1939) – Lobbyist Hutton (uncredited)
We Are Not Alone (1939) – Dr. Stacey
British Intelligence (1940) – Cmdr. Phelps (uncredited)
I Was an Adventuress (1940) – Englishman at Party (uncredited)
The Sea Hawk (1940) – Lieutenant (uncredited)
Foreign Correspondent (1940) – Toastmaster (uncredited)
A Dispatch from Reuters (1940) – Editor Wanting Contract Voided (uncredited)
The Letter (1940) – Robert's Friend at Bar (uncredited)
South of Suez (1940) – Sedley
Shining Victory (1941) – Dr. Corliss
Time Out for Rhythm (1941) – Marlow (uncredited)
Our Wife (1941) – Ship's Doctor (uncredited)
International Squadron (1941) – Major Fresney (uncredited)
A Yank in the R.A.F. (1941) – Group Captain (uncredited)
Paris Calling (1941) – British Naval Officer (uncredited)
Flight Lieutenant (1942) – Company Official (uncredited)
Journey for Margaret (1942) – Everton (uncredited)
Keeper of the Flame (1942) – Ambassador (uncredited)
City Without Men (1943) – Prosecuting Attorney (uncredited)
The Mysterious Doctor (1943) – Army Commander (uncredited)
The Constant Nymph (1943) – Thorpe
The Lodger (1944) – The King's Aide (uncredited)
Four Jills in a Jeep (1944) – British Officer (uncredited)
The Black Parachute (1944) – Prime Minister Paul (uncredited)
The Picture of Dorian Gray (1945) – Friend (uncredited)
The Fatal Witness (1945) – Jepson, the butler
The Dolly Sisters (1945) – Man (uncredited)
Kitty (1945) – Sir Joshua's Friend (uncredited)
Devotion (1946) – Club Member (uncredited)
The Verdict (1946) – Professional Man (uncredited)
The Imperfect Lady (1947) – Headwaiter (uncredited)
Unconquered (1947) – Chaplain (uncredited)
If Winter Comes (1947) – Gambling Guest (uncredited)
The Woman in White (1948) – Rector (uncredited)
Samson and Delilah (1949) – Court Astrologer in Council Chambers (uncredited)
Tea for Two (1950) – Stevens, the Butler (uncredited)
Painting the Clouds with Sunshine (1951) – Board Member (uncredited)
Pat and Mike (1952) – Tennis Umpire (uncredited) (final film role)

References

External links 

 (alternate spelling)
signed picture(archived)
autographed picture(archived)

1881 births
1953 deaths
English male film actors
English male silent film actors
British expatriate male actors in the United States
Burials at Valhalla Memorial Park Cemetery
Male actors from London
20th-century English male actors